Edward John Harper  (July 23, 1910 — December 2, 1990) was an American member of the Congregation of the Most Holy Redeemer (more commonly known as the Redemptorists) and a prelate of the Roman Catholic Church. He was the first Bishop of Saint Thomas in the Virgin Islands, serving in that office from 1977 to 1985.

Life
Harper was born on July 23, 1910, in the Bay Ridge neighborhood of Brooklyn, New York. He initially began a career as an accountant, but he later felt called to become a missionary and entered the Redemptorists in 1933, making his temporary profession of religious vows as a member of the congregation on August 2 of the following year. He was ordained a priest on June 18, 1939. He was then assigned by his superiors to serve on various islands of the Caribbean.

On July 23, 1960, Harper was appointed by Pope John XXIII as the first Apostolic Prefect of the newly erected Apostolic Prelature of the Virgin Islands and Titular Bishop of Heraclea Pontica. He received his episcopal consecration on the following October 6 from Bryan J. McEntegart, Bishop of Brooklyn, with Bishops William Tibertus McCarty and James Edward McManus serving as co-consecrators, at Our Lady of Perpetual Help Church in Brooklyn.

Upon the elevation of his prelature to the Diocese of Saint Thomas, Harper was named its first bishop on April 20, 1977. After twenty-five years of service in the Virgin Islands, he retired on October 16, 1985, upon which he was given the title of Bishop Emeritus of Saint Thomas. He died on December 2, 1990, at the age of 80 years.

References

1910 births
1990 deaths
People from Bay Ridge, Brooklyn
Mount St. Alphonsus Seminary alumni
Redemptorist bishops
Roman Catholic bishops of Saint Thomas
Participants in the Second Vatican Council
Place of death missing
20th-century Roman Catholic bishops in the Caribbean
Catholics from New York (state)
20th-century American Roman Catholic priests
American Roman Catholic bishops by contiguous area of the United States